Oliver John Savatsky (May 13, 1911 – December 24, 1989) was an American football end who played one season with the Cleveland Rams of the National Football League. He played college football at Miami University. He first enrolled at Cathedral Latin High School in Cleveland, Ohio before transferring to Lincoln High School in Cleveland. Oliver changed high last named to Sawyer after his football career. His last name has also been spelled "Savotsky".

References

External links
Just Sports Stats

1911 births
1989 deaths
Players of American football from Cleveland
American football ends
Miami RedHawks football players
Cleveland Rams players